(formerly Eurybia pygmaea and Aster pygmaeus) is a species of flowering plant in the family Asteraceae. Its summer-blooming flowers have purple to violet ray florets and yellow disk florets.

, it was classified by NatureServe (as Eurybia pygmaea) as Apparently Secure (G4) globally; Apparently Secure (S4) in Northwest Territories and Nunavut; and, Imperiled (S2) in Alaska. Its global status was last reviewed by NatureServe on  Several known locations of the plant, especially in Alaska, are near oil field developments, increasing the potential threat to its survival in those areas. "The sand and gravel sites favored by this species  prized for material sites by mineral and oil exploration and development companies."

Citations

References

 
 
 
 

pygmaeum
Flora of Alaska
Flora of Yukon
Flora of the Northwest Territories
Plants described in 1834
Taxa named by John Lindley